Revgear is an American company that encompasses innovative design, development, manufacturing, worldwide marketing and sales of martial arts supplies, equipment, apparel, and services. The company is headquartered in Van Nuys, California, in the Los Angeles metropolitan area, with over 21 years experience of being a leading supplier of martial arts supplies and equipment to martial arts schools, organizations, and direct consumers.

The company was founded in July 1996 by Paul Reavlin, a CPA and Krav Maga First Degree Black Belt. Years of intense, first-hand training inspired Reavlin to produce a top-of-line series of equipment that would hold up to the most demanding martial arts disciplines. In addition to manufacturing martial arts supplies and equipment, the company produces live events under the Revgear Seminar Division. Nationwide events include Revolution: International Martial Arts Professionals Conference, Revgear University, Revgear Tournament of Champions for Muay Thai, and Revgear Competition League for Brazilian jiu-jitsu. Revgear has sponsored many professional athletes in martial arts and combat sports.

Products and services

Revgear Products Division is known for its vast range of martial arts equipment. The company started with three very unusual products: an innovative knuckle protector, known today as the MMA training glove, and two styles of kick and punch shields, a curved version and the original five-sided Tombstone. Today, Revgear develops and manufactures boxing and MMA gloves, shin guards, headgear, target pads, sparring gear and hundreds of other products for a multitude of disciplines such as Muay Thai, kickboxing, Krav Maga, Jiu Jitsu, and mixed martial arts. Revgear has launched multiple successful limited edition series including Master Toddy Series, Revgear Combat Series, Samurai Series, Thai Destroyer Series, and others. Revgear recently introduced its Phoenix Sparring Mitt, an all-in-one focus mitt and boxing glove, and Fitness Pod, a multi-purpose throwing bag driving cross-training to the next level.

Revgear products are made for men, women, and children canvassing a wide variety of disciplines. Revgear heavy bags, speed bags, double-end bags, cages, rings, training ropes, kettlebells, grappling dummies, ring timers, and the like are used in thousands of martial arts academies, dojos and fitness facilities. Revgear is the popular and first choice, among coaches, professional athletes, instructors, and academy and gym owners around the world.

In 2014, Revgear premiered Revgear Competition League and Revolution: International Martial Arts Professionals Conference under its Revgear Seminar Division.

Marketing strategy

Revgear promotes its products and services through sponsorship agreements with professional athletes, professional organizations, and via product endorsements through amateur athletes, martial arts academies, dojos, and gyms. In addition Revgear promotes its products and services via martial arts and fitness events as well as seminars, workshops and webinars.

Advertising

In 1996 Revgear published its first national print media advertising campaign featuring Marco Ruas, a professional mixed martial arts fighter and UFC 7 Tournament Champion. Revgear has advertised in trade publications: Black Belt Magazine, Karate Kung Fu, Inside Kung Fu, MA Training, World of Martial Arts, and wide variety of digital media outlets including Sherdog, MixedMartialArts.com and MMAWeekly.com. Revgear continues to send its catalog of Martial Arts supplies via traditional mail and is one of the few suppliers to offer a catalog, online presence and a full sales and service center.

Martial arts events

Revgear is the preferred glove, headgear, and shin guard provider of many professional and amateur martial arts organizations and competitions in karate, Muay Thai, Jiu Jitsu and mixed martial arts. MMA promotions using Revgear as their official ‘glove’ include BAMMA USA, Colosseum Combat, and Sparta Combat League.

Athlete endorsement and sponsorship

Revgear has worked closely with professional athletes and coaches throughout their 20-year history to test, promote, and advertise the brand and products.

Revgear’s first professional endorsed athlete Marco Ruas, a longtime friend of Revgear founder Paul Reavlin, was heavily involved in testing and developing equipment during the early years of the company. The company continues to test their products with industry professionals including Erik Paulson, Rafael Cordeiro, Mark DellaGrotte, Cesar Gracie, and others.

Revgear was an official, approved sponsor of the Ultimate Fighting Championship and sponsored hundreds of pro-level champions and mixed martial artists including Tim Kennedy, Rory MacDonald, Johny Hendricks, Shane Carwin, Dan Hardy, Ed Herman, Ricardo Lamas, Chris Camozzi, Alan Jouban, Roy Nelson, and many others.

In addition, Revgear has supported numerous amateur athletes in combat sports through the Revgear Ambassador Program. The program was designed to provide training and competition equipment and apparel for non-professionals, advancing their skills to become the next generation of stars in their sport.

References

1996 establishments in California
Martial arts equipment
Sportswear brands